Chachapoyas District is one of twenty-one districts of Chachapoyas Province in Peru.

References

See also 
 Administrative divisions of Peru

Districts of the Chachapoyas Province
Districts of the Amazonas Region